Robert Harriot Barrat (July 10, 1891 – January 7, 1970) was an American stage, motion picture, and television character actor.

Early years
Barratt was born on July 10, 1891, in New York City and was educated in the public schools there. He left college and home during his sophomore year, traveling on a tramp steamer to Central America, England, France, and South America. After he returned to the United States, he worked for two years on his brother's farm near Springfield, Massachusetts, until he learned of an opening in the chorus for a musical comedy.

Career
Early in his career, Barrat traveled around the United States, sometimes acting with stock theater companies and sometimes performing in vaudeville on the Keith and Orpheum circuits. Returning to New York City, he had a role in The Weavers at the Garden Theatre.

Barrat acted on Broadway, where his credits include Lilly Turner (1932), Bulls, Bears and Asses (1931), This Is New York (1930), Judas (1928), The Lady Lies (1928), A Lady for a Night (1927), Marco Millions (1927), Chicago (1926), Kid Boots (1923), The Breaking Point (1923), The Unwritten Chapter (1920), The Crimson Alibi (1919), The Invisible Foe (1918), and Some One in the House (1918).

Barrat appeared in around 150 films, uncredited in some of them, in a Hollywood career that lasted four decades. He appeared in seven pictures with James Cagney during the 1930s. Two of his most noted roles were as the murder victim Archer Coe in Michael Curtiz's The Kennel Murder Case (1933) and as the treacherous Major Ferdinand Walsin Esterhazy in the 1937 Academy Award winning film The Life of Emile Zola. He played several other historical characters as well, among them Davy Crockett in Man of Conquest, Zachary Taylor in Distant Drums, Abraham Lincoln in Trailin' West, Cornelius Van Horne in Canadian Pacific and General Douglas MacArthur twice, in They Were Expendable and American Guerrilla in the Philippines. He also appeared with the Marx Brothers in Go West (1940).

In the mid 1950s, Barrat transitioned to television roles. His final acting appearance was in an episode of The Alfred Hitchcock Hour in 1964.

Death
He died of a heart ailment in Hollywood in 1970, aged 78. He was survived by his wife, Mary Dean. He was buried at Green Hill Cemetery, Martinsburg, West Virginia.

Complete filmography
 

Her Own Way (1915) - Lt. Richard Coleman
The Wonder Man (1920) - Alan Gardner
Whispering Shadows (1921) - Hugh Brook
Honor Among Lovers (1931) - Detective (uncredited)
The Wiser Sex (1932) - Plainclothesman (uncredited)
Pack Up Your Troubles (1932) - Detective (uncredited)
King of the Jungle (1933) - Joe Nolan
The Mind Reader (1933) - Detective (uncredited)
Picture Snatcher (1933) - Grover
Lilly Turner (1933) - Fritz 'Heinie'
The Life of Jimmy Dolan (1933) - Sheriff (uncredited)
Ann Carver's Profession (1933) - Andrew Simmons - Attorney (uncredited)
The Silk Express (1933) - Mr. Calhoun, Attorney
Heroes for Sale (1933) - Max
The Mayor of Hell (1933) - Fred Smith
Baby Face (1933) - Nick Powers
Secret of the Blue Room (1933) - Paul, the Butler
The Devil's in Love (1933) - Maj. Bertram (uncredited)
Tugboat Annie (1933) - First Mate of 'Glacier Queen' (uncredited)
Captured! (1933) - The Commandant
My Lips Betray (1933) - Undetermined Role (uncredited)
Wild Boys of the Road (1933) - Judge R.H. White
I Loved a Woman (1933) - Charles Lane
The Kennel Murder Case (1933) - Archer Coe
From Headquarters (1933) - Anderzian
Massacre (1934) - Dawson
Hi, Nellie! (1934) - Beau Brownell
Not Tonight, Josephine (1934, Short)
Dark Hazard (1934) - Tex Willis
Wonder Bar (1934) - Captain Hugo Von Ferring
Gambling Lady (1934) - Mike Lee
A Very Honorable Guy (1934) - Dr. Snitzer
Upper World (1934) - Police Commissioner Clark
Fog Over Frisco (1934) - Thorne
Return of the Terror (1934) - Pudge Walker
Midnight Alibi (1934) - Angie Morley
Here Comes the Navy (1934) - Commander Denny
Friends of Mr. Sweeney (1934) - Alex (Credits) / Alexis Romanoff
Housewife (1934) - Sam Blake
The Dragon Murder Case (1934) - Stamm
Big Hearted Herbert (1934) - Jim
I Sell Anything (1934) - McPherson
The St. Louis Kid (1934) - Farmer Benson
The Firebird (1934) - Halasz - the Apartment House Manager
I Am a Thief (1934) - Baron Von Kampf
Bordertown (1935) - Padre
Devil Dogs of the Air (1935) - Commandant
While the Patient Slept (1935) - Adolphe
The Florentine Dagger (1935) - The Captain
Village Tale (1935) - Drury Stevenson
Stranded  (1935) - Stanislaus Janauschek
The Murder Man (1935) - Hal Robins - Newspaper Editor
Special Agent (1935) - Chief of Internal Revenue Service
Dressed to Thrill (1935) - Gaston Dupont
Dr. Socrates (1935) - Dr. Ginder
Moonlight on the Prairie (1935) - Buck Cantrell
Captain Blood (1935) - Wolverstone
Exclusive Story (1936) - Werther
The Trail of the Lonesome Pine (1936) - Buck Falin
The Country Doctor (1936) - MacKenzie
I Married a Doctor (1936) - Nels Valborg
Sons o' Guns (1936) - Pierre
Mary of Scotland (1936) - Norton
The Last of the Mohicans (1936) - Chingachgook
Trailin' West (1936) - Abraham Lincoln
The Charge of the Light Brigade (1936) - Count Igor Volonoff
God's Country and the Woman (1937) -  Jefferson Russett
Black Legion (1937) - Brown (uncredited)
The Barrier (1937) - John Gale
Mountain Justice (1937) - Jeff Harkins
Draegerman Courage (1937) - Martin Crane
Souls at Sea (1937) - The Reverend (uncredited)
The Life of Emile Zola (1937) - Major Walsin-Esterhazy
Confession (1937) - Prosecuting Attorney
Love Is on the Air (1937) - J.D. Harrington
The Bad Man of Brimstone (1937) - 'Hank' Summers
The Buccaneer (1938) - Captain Brown
Penitentiary (1938) - Prison Yard Capt. Grady
Forbidden Valley (1938) - Ramrod Locke
Marie Antoinette (1938) - Citizen-Officer (uncredited)
The Texans (1938) - Isaiah Middlebrack
Breaking the Ice (1938) - William Decker
Shadows Over Shanghai (1938) - Igor Sargoza
Charlie Chan in Honolulu (1938) - Captain Johnson
Union Pacific (1939) - Duke Ring
The Return of the Cisco Kid (1939) - Sheriff McNally
Man of Conquest (1939) - David Crockett
Heritage of the Desert (1939) - Andrew Naab
Colorado Sunset (1939) - Dr. Rodney Blair
Conspiracy (1939) - Tio / Edwards
Bad Lands (1939) - Sheriff Bill Cummings
Allegheny Uprising (1939) - Duncan
The Cisco Kid and the Lady (1939) - Jim Harbison
Laddie (1940) - Mr. John Stanton
The Man from Dakota (1940) - Parson Summers
Northwest Passage (1940) - Humphrey Towne
Captain Caution (1940) - Capt. Dorman
Fugitive from a Prison Camp (1940) - Chester Russell
Go West (1940) - 'Red' Baxter
They Met in Argentina (1941) - Don Enrique de los Santos O'Shea
Parachute Battalion (1941) - Col. Burke
Riders of the Purple Sage (1941) - Judge Frank Dyer
The Girl from Alaska (1942) - Frayne
Fall In (1942) - Col. Elliott
American Empire (1942) - Crowder
A Stranger in Town (1943) - Mayor Connison
They Came to Blow Up America (1943) - Capt. Kranz
Bomber's Moon (1943) - Ernst
Johnny Come Lately (1943) - Bill Swain
The Adventures of Mark Twain (1944) - Horace E. Bixby - Riverboat Captain
Enemy of Women (1944) - Wallburg the Publisher
The Keys of the Kingdom (1944) - Willie's Father (scenes deleted)
Grissly's Millions (1945) - Grissly Morgan Palmor
The Great John L. (1945) - Billy Muldoon
Wanderer of the Wasteland (1945) - Uncle Jim Collinshaw
Dakota (1945) - Anson Stowe
Road to Utopia (1945) - Sperry
They Were Expendable (1945) - General MacArthur
San Antonio (1945) - Col. Johnson
Strangler of the Swamp (1946) - Christian Sanders
Just Before Dawn (1946) - Clyde Travers
Sunset Pass (1946) - Rand Curtis
The Time of Their Lives (1946) - Maj. Putnam
Dangerous Millions (1946) - Hendrick Van Boyden
Magnificent Doll (1946) - Mr. Payne
The Sea of Grass (1947) - Judge Seth White
The Fabulous Texan (1947) - Dr. Sharp
Road to Rio (1947) - Johnson
I Love Trouble (1948) - Lt. Quint
Relentless (1948) - Ed Simpson
Joan of Arc (1948) - Jacques d'Arc
Bad Men of Tombstone (1949) - Leadville Sheriff
Song of India (1949) - Maharajah of Ramjat
The Lone Wolf and His Lady (1949) - Steve Taylor
Canadian Pacific (1949) - Cornelius Van Horne
The Doolins of Oklahoma (1949) - Marshal Heck Thomas
Davy Crockett, Indian Scout (1950) - James Lone Eagle
Riders of the Range (1950) - Sheriff Cole
The Baron of Arizona (1950) - Judge
The Kid from Texas (1950) - General Lew Wallace
American Guerrilla in the Philippines (1950) - Gen. Douglas MacArthur
The Pride of Maryland (1951) - Colonel Harding
Double Crossbones (1951) - Henry Morgan
Darling, How Could You! (1951) - Mr. Rossiter
Flight to Mars (1951) - Tillamar
Distant Drums (1951) - Gen. Zachary Taylor
Denver and Rio Grande (1952) - Charlie Haskins
Son of Ali Baba (1952) - Commandant
Cow Country (1953) - Walt Garnet
Tall Man Riding (1955) - Tucker Ordway

References

External links

1891 births
1970 deaths
20th-century American male actors
American male film actors
American male silent film actors
American male stage actors
American male television actors
Burials at Green Hill Cemetery (Martinsburg, West Virginia)
Male actors from New York City